Zwartowo may refer to the following places:
Zwartowo, Pomeranian Voivodeship (north Poland)
Zwartowo, Białogard County in West Pomeranian Voivodeship (north-west Poland)
Zwartowo, Szczecinek County in West Pomeranian Voivodeship (north-west Poland)